is a Japanese male volleyball player. With his club Panasonic Panthers he competed at the 2013 FIVB Volleyball Men's Club World Championship.

References

External links
 profile at FIVB.org
 

1990 births
Living people
Sportspeople from Aichi Prefecture
Japanese men's volleyball players
Place of birth missing (living people)
Volleyball players at the 2014 Asian Games
Volleyball players at the 2018 Asian Games
Asian Games medalists in volleyball
Universiade medalists in volleyball
Medalists at the 2014 Asian Games
Asian Games silver medalists for Iran
Universiade bronze medalists for Japan
Medalists at the 2013 Summer Universiade